This is a list of electoral results for the Electoral district of Dundas in Western Australian state elections.

Members for Dundas

Election results

Elections in the 1900s

Elections in the 1890s

References

Western Australian state electoral results by district